George Curry (April 3, 1861November 27, 1947) was a U.S. military officer and politician. He was governor of New Mexico Territory from 1907 to 1910, and once it became a state he represented it in the 62nd United States Congress. Curry County, New Mexico, is named in his honor.

Early life 
He was born in West Feliciana Parish, Louisiana, on April 3, 1861, to George Alexander and Clara Madden Curry. He was the eldest of four sons. Curry's mother was a graduate of Dublin University and his father was a mechanic who managed Greenwood Plantation. His father served as a captain in the Confederate Army and after the Civil War purchased Sevastopol Plantation. Curry's father was a parish leader of the local Ku Klux Klan, and in 1870 he was ambushed and killed. Three years later Curry's mother moved the family to Dodge City, Kansas, where Curry got his first job at age 12 working as a messenger boy for a mercantile company. Following his mother's death in 1879, Curry moved to Lincoln County, New Mexico, where he worked on a cattle ranch until 1881. Over the next few years Curry held several jobs managing stores and hotels.  He acted as post trader at Fort Stanton, and engaged in the mercantile and stock business until 1886.

Career
Curry began his political career at age 23 when he became a member of Colfax County's delegation at the Democratic Territorial Convention in Albuquerque. He was deputy treasurer of Lincoln County, New Mexico, in 1886 and 1887, elected county clerk in 1888, county assessor in 1890, and sheriff in 1892. He served as a member of the Territorial senate in 1894 and 1896, serving as president in his final year in the body.

During the Spanish–American War he served in Theodore Roosevelt's Rough Riders.  He did not see action in Cuba, but did participate in the fighting in the Philippines.

After returning from the war, he became sheriff of Otero County, New Mexico, in 1899, when he resigned to join the Eleventh Volunteer Cavalry.  He then served from December 16, 1899, to March 20, 1901, as the Governor of the Province of Camarines in 1901, the chief of police of the city of Manila for the remainder of 1901, the Governor of the Province of Isabela from 1903 to 1905, and the Governor of the Province of Samar from 1905 to 1907.

He served as the 18th Governor of New Mexico Territory from 1907 to 1910, and upon the admission of New Mexico as a State into the Union was elected as a Republican to the Sixty-second Congress and served from January 8, 1912, to March 3, 1913.

Curry declined to be a candidate for renomination in 1912.  He then engaged in the hotel business in Socorro, New Mexico, was private secretary to US Senator Holm O. Bursum in 1921 and 1922, and was a member of the International Boundary Commission from 1922 to 1927.   After retiring, he moved to a ranch near Cutter, and served as State Historian from 1945 until his death in Albuquerque on November 27, 1947, with interment in the Santa Fe National Cemetery. Curry County, New Mexico, was named in his honor.

Magtaon Attack 
On March 24, 1906, During the Pulahan Campaign as Governor of Samar, Curry negotiated with Cipriano "Teducduc" Amango and Isidro "Otoy" Pompac the Pulahan leaders of South-Eastern Samar. Assured that the Pulahan forces were falling from attrition, Curry negotiated to meet at a neutral small barrio not shown on most maps, Magtaon in Mapanas, Northern Samar. For the negotiations the army garrison was replaced by a constabulary unit. Present for the negotiations were Curry, a constabulary honour guard and visitors. As the Pulahan began filing in they suddenly attacked, killing 22 constables, capturing several rifles and fleeing into the jungle. Curry barely escaped and in retaliation ordered "in your operations outside the towns and barrios you may kill anyone you have reason to [believe] a pulahan'; those who were members of the 'Magtaon band' were to be 'exterminated'"

Gallery

References

External links
Spanish American War web page about George Curry
Political Graveyard

1861 births
1947 deaths
People from West Feliciana Parish, Louisiana
Republican Party members of the United States House of Representatives from New Mexico
Governors of New Mexico Territory
Members of the New Mexico Territorial Legislature
Governors of Camarines Sur
People of the Spanish–American War
People born in the Confederate States